The Women's time trial of the 2020 UCI Road World Championships was a cycling event that took place on 24 September 2020 in Imola, Italy. Chloé Dygert was the defending champion. The race was won by Anna van der Breggen of the Netherlands, with Marlen Reusser finishing second, and Ellen van Dijk finishing third. Dygert had recorded the fastest time to the intermediate timing point, but did not finish the race, after crashing over a guardrail and down an embankment.

The event took place on a  flat course, starting from the Autodromo Internazionale Enzo e Dino Ferrari (a motor racing circuit) before turning at Borgo Tossignano to return to the finish line at the Autodromo.

Final classification 
51 cyclists were listed to start the -long course.

References

External links

Women's time trial
UCI Road World Championships – Women's time trial
2020 in women's road cycling